This page lists the World Best Year Performance in the year 1996 in the men's decathlon. One of the main events during this season were the 1996 Olympic Games in Atlanta, Georgia, where the competition started on July 31, 1996, and ended on August 1, 1996.

Records

1996 World Year Ranking

See also
1996 Hypo-Meeting
Athletics at the 1996 Summer Olympics – Men's decathlon

References
apulanta
digilander

1996
Decathlon Year Ranking, 1996